Mononc' Serge (real name Serge Robert) is a Québécois musician and poet who sings in French. He is best known for his vulgar lyrics and his irreverent songs making fun of local celebrities and politicians. He is also quite sardonic with the Quebec federalist movement, and their counterparts in the Rest Of Canada (R.O.C.). "Mononc' Serge" is French for "Uncle Serge".

History 
Serge was recruited in 1991 by Dédé Fortin to play bass with Les Colocs. He stayed with the band until 1995, then began a solo career as Mononc' Serge.

His 2001 album Mon voyage au Canada (My Trip to Canada) features one song for each Canadian province and territory, mostly poking fun at each of them.

In 2003 he teamed up with the thrash metal band Anonymus, and released an album named L'Académie du Massacre, which contains metal versions of Mononc' Serge's songs, along with a few new compositions. They later released a DVD titled La Pâques Satanique. In 2008, reunited with Anonymus for a new album, titled Musique Barbare.

Discography 
 1997: Mononc' Serge chante 97
 1998: Mourir pour le Canada
 1998: Mononc' Serge chante 98
 2000: 13 tounes trash
 2001: Mon voyage au Canada
 2003: L'Académie du massacre (with Anonymus)
 2006: Serge Blanc d'Amérique
 2008: Musique barbare (with Anonymus)
 2011: Final Bâton DVD recorded Live in Montreal 2010.12.28 and Quebec 2010.12.29 (with Anonymus)
 2012: Ca, c'est d'la femme!
 2013: Pourquoi Mononc' Serge joues-tu du rock'n'roll?
 2015: Mononc' Serge 2015
 2017: Révolution conservatrice
 2019: Réchauffé
 2020: Réchauffé II
 2021: L'an 8000

References

External links
 Official site
 Mononc' Serge Merch  on IFmerch.com

Living people
French Quebecers
Canadian rock musicians
Musicians from Quebec
Canadian comedy musicians
Year of birth missing (living people)
Les Colocs members